Broadwood is one of the 13 constituencies of the Wan Chai District Council in Hong Kong. The seat elects one member of the council every four years. it was first created in 1999 and is now held by Legislative Councillor Paul Tse Wai-chun. The boundary is loosely based on the area of Broadwood Road.

Councillors represented

Election results

2010s

2000s

1990s

References

2011 District Council Election Results (Wan Chai)
2007 District Council Election Results (Wan Chai)
2003 District Council Election Results (Wan Chai)
1999 District Council Election Results (Wan Chai)
 

Constituencies of Hong Kong
Constituencies of Wan Chai District Council
1999 establishments in Hong Kong
Constituencies established in 1999